A software architect is a software engineer responsible for high-level design choices related to overall system structure and behavior.

See also
 Software architecture
 Software engineering

References

External links
 International Association of Software Architects (IASA)